Langport was a 50-gun third rate  frigate built for the navy of the Commonwealth of England at Horsleydown, and launched in 1654.

After the Restoration in 1660, she was renamed HMS Henrietta. By 1677 her armament had risen to 62 guns. Henrietta was wrecked in 1689.

Notes

References

Lavery, Brian (2003) The Ship of the Line - Volume 1: The development of the battlefleet 1650–1850. Conway Maritime Press. .

Ships of the line of the Royal Navy
1650s ships
Speaker-class ships of the line